Pashtun nationalism generally refers to the idea that Pashtuns must always be united to preserve their culture and defend their homeland against any oppressor. It propagates the view that Muslims are not a nation and that ethnic loyalty must come before religious loyalty. In Afghanistan, those who strongly advocate Pashtun nationalism favor the idea of a "Greater Afghanistan", which includes Khyber Pakhtunkhwa and Balochistan, and be ruled directly under Pashtun principles.

History

One of the earliest Pashtun nationalists was the 16th-century revolutionary leader Bayazid Pir Roshan from Waziristan. Another early Pashtun nationalist was the 17th-century "warrior-poet" Khushal Khan Khattak, who was imprisoned by the Mughal emperor Aurangzeb for trying to incite the Pashtuns to rebel against the rule of the Mughals. However, despite sharing a common language and believing in a common ancestry, the Pashtuns first achieved unity in the 18th century after being under foreign rule for many centuries. The eastern parts of Pashtunistan was ruled by the Mughal Empire, while the western parts were ruled by the Persian Safavids as their easternmost provinces. During the early 18th century, Pashtun tribes led by Mirwais Hotak successfully revolted against the Safavids in the city of Kandahar. In a chain of events, he declared Loy Kandahar and other parts of what is now southern Afghanistan independent. By 1738 the Mughal Empire had been crushingly defeated and their capital sacked and looted by forces of a new Iranian ruler; the military genius and commander Nader Shah Afshar. Besides Persian, Turkmen, and Caucasian forces, Nader was also accompanied by the young Ahmad Shah Durrani and 4,000 well-trained Pashtun troops.

After the death of Nader Shah in 1747 and the disintegration of his massive empire, Ahmad Shah Durrani created his own large and powerful Durrani Empire, which included Pashtunistan, and most of present-day Pakistan, among other regions. The famous couplet by Ahmad Shah Durrani describes the association the people have with the regional city of Kandahar:
Da Dilī takht zə hērawəma chē rāyād kṛəm, zəmā da ṣ̌hkuləi Paṣ̌htūnkhwā da ghrō sarūna.Translation: "I forget the throne of Delhi when I recall, the mountain peaks of my beautiful Pashtunkhwa."

The last Afghan Empire was established in 1747 and united all the different Pashtun tribes as well as many other ethnic groups. Parts of the Pashtunistan region around Peshawar was invaded by Ranjit Singh and his Sikh army in the early part of the 19th century, but a few years later they were defeated by the British Raj, the new powerful empire which reached the Pashtunistan region from the east.

Famous Pashtun independence activists against the rule of the British Raj include Bacha Khan, Abdul Samad Khan Achakzai, and Mirzali Khan (Faqir of Ipi). Bacha Khan and his followers, the Khudai Khidmatgars, strongly opposed the All-India Muslim League's demand for the partition of India. When the Indian National Congress declared its acceptance of the partition plan without consulting the Khudai Khidmatgar leaders, Bacha Khan felt very sad and told the Congress "you have thrown us to the wolves." In June 1947, Bacha Khan, Mirzali Khan, and the Khudai Khidmatgar movement declared the Bannu Resolution, demanding that the Pashtuns be given a choice to have an independent state of Pashtunistan composing all Pashtun territories of British India, instead of being made to join Pakistan. However, the British Raj refused to comply with the demand of this resolution due to which the Khudai Khidmatgars boycotted the 1947 North-West Frontier Province referendum. After the creation of Pakistan in 1947, Mirzali Khan and his followers refused to recognize Pakistan and continued their guerrilla war against the new state's government from their base in Gurwek, Waziristan, which did not receive much success.

See also
Pashtunistan
Pashtunization
Pashtoons Social Democratic Party
Durand Line
Kabir Stori
Khudai Khidmatgar
Bacha Khan
Abdul Samad Khan Achakzai
Mirzali Khan
Mullah Powindah
Sartor Faqir
Umra Khan
Awami National Party
Pashtunkhwa Milli Awami Party
Afghan Millat Party
Pashtun colonization of northern Afghanistan

References

 
Durand Line
Pashtun politics